Jonathan Hale (born Jonathan Hatley; March 21, 1891 – February 28, 1966) was a Canadian-born film and television actor.

Life and career
Hale was born in Hamilton, Ontario, Canada. Before his acting career, Hale worked in the Diplomatic Corps. Hale is most well known as Dagwood Bumstead's boss, Julius Caesar Dithers, in the Blondie film series in the 1940s. He is also notable for playing Inspector Fernack in various The Saint films by RKO Pictures.

In 1950 he made two appearances in The Cisco Kid as Barry Owens. He also appeared in two different episodes of Adventures of Superman: "The Evil Three", in which he played a murderous "Southern Colonel"-type character, and "Panic in the Sky", one of the most famous episodes, in which he played the lead astronomer at the Metropolis Observatory, actually a  California observatory.

Among the relatively few television programs on which Hale appeared are the religion anthology series Crossroads, The Loretta Young Show, Brave Eagle, Schlitz Playhouse, The Joey Bishop Show, Our Miss Brooks and Walt Disney Presents: "A Tribute to Joel Chandler Harris".

Death
Hale committed suicide on February 28, 1966, at the age of 74. He was found dead that evening in his room at the Motion Picture & Television Country House and Hospital in Woodland Hills, California. Hale had taken his own life with a .38 caliber pistol, which was found near his body. He was interred at Valhalla Memorial Park Cemetery in North Hollywood, California. His grave went unmarked for more than four decades, until a proper headstone was erected by donations from the "Dearly Departed" fan-based group in 2013; he is now honored with the inscription, "We Remembered You".

Selected filmography

 Housewife (1934) as Doctor (uncredited)
 The Case of the Howling Dog (1934) as Courtroom Spectator (uncredited)
 A Lost Lady (1934) (uncredited) 
 Gentlemen Are Born (1934) as Second Broker (uncredited)
 Lightning Strikes Twice (1934) as Capt. Hobart Nelson
 A Night at the Ritz (1935) as Director (uncredited)
 One New York Night (1935) as Mr. Stokes (uncredited)
 G Men (1935) as Congressman (uncredited)
 Let 'Em Have It (1935) as Microscopic Expert (uncredited)
 Public Hero No. 1 (1935) as Prison Board Member (uncredited)
 The Raven (1935) as Bedside Dr. at Jerry's Right (uncredited)
 Alice Adams (1935) as Mr. Palmer
 Page Miss Glory (1935) as Husband at Train Station (uncredited)
 Navy Wife (1935) as Norton (uncredited)
 Three Kids and a Queen (1935) as Gangster (uncredited)
 A Night at the Opera (1935) as Stage Manager in Opera Box Who Announces Gottlieb's Disappearance (uncredited)
 The Calling of Dan Matthews (1935) as Club Owner (uncredited)
 Too Tough to Kill (1935) as Chairman of the Board (uncredited)
 If You Could Only Cook (1935) as Henry Brown - Member of Board of Directors (uncredited)
 Three Live Ghosts (1936) as Detective Bolton
 Charlie Chan's Secret (1936) as Warren T. Phelps
 You May Be Next (1936) as Army Officer (uncredited)
 The Voice of Bugle Ann (1936) as District Attorney
 Sutter's Gold (1936) as Prosecuting Attorney (uncredited)
 Too Many Parents (1936) as Judge
 The Singing Kid (1936) as Dr. Brown (uncredited)
 Panic on the Air (1936) as Johnson (uncredited)
 The Case Against Mrs. Ames (1936) as Judge at First Trial
 Educating Father (1936) as Fred Humphrey
 Fury (1936) as Defense Attorney
 Parole! (1936) as Parole Board Member (uncredited)
 Spendthrift (1936) as Attorney (uncredited)
 36 Hours to Kill (1936) as Conductor
 Charlie Chan at the Race Track (1936) as Warren Fenton
 China Clipper (1936) as State Department Official (uncredited)
 Down the Stretch (1936) as Secretary M.L. Lyon (uncredited)
 The Devil Is a Sissy (1936) as Judge Holmes
 The Magnificent Brute (1936) as Official (uncredited)
 Easy to Take (1936) as Mr. Hardy (uncredited)
 The Plainsman (1936) as Major (uncredited)
 The Accusing Finger (1936) as Special Prosecutor
 Born to Dance (1936) as Hector the Columnist (uncredited)
 Flying Hostess (1936) as Kendall
 Happy Go Lucky (1936) as J. Lansing Bennett
 Sinner Take All (1936) as Dr. Harrison (uncredited)
 Mysterious Crossing (1936) as Garland - Banker (uncredited)
 You Only Live Once (1937) as District Attorney (uncredited)
 She's Dangerous (1937) as Charles Fitzgerald
 Man of the People (1937) as Carter Spetner
 Outcast (1937) as Judge (uncredited)
 A Doctor's Diary (1937) as Mr. Williams (uncredited)
 Sea Devils (1937) as Court-Martial President (uncredited)
 John Meade's Woman (1937) as Mr. Melton
 Racketeers in Exile (1937) as Alden Parker
 The Man Who Found Himself (1937) as Dr. Tom Smythe (uncredited)
 A Star Is Born (1937) as Judge George J. Parris (uncredited)
 You Can't Buy Luck (1937) as Prosecutor (uncredited)
 Wings Over Honolulu (1937) as Judge Advocate (uncredited)
 Charlie Chan at the Olympics (1937) as Hopkins
 The League of Frightened Men (1937) as Alexander Drummond
 This Is My Affair (1937) as Judge
 Midnight Madonna (1937) as Stuart Kirkland
 Saratoga (1937) as Frank Clayton
 Danger – Love at Work (1937) as Parsons
 Madame X (1937) as Hugh Fariman Sr
 Carnival Queen (1937) as Robert Jacoby
 Big Town Girl (1937) as Hershell
 Exiled to Shanghai (1937) as J.B. Willet
 Arsène Lupin Returns (1938) as F.B.I. Special Agent
 Mad About Music (1938) as Prosecutor, Film Within a Film (uncredited)
 The First Hundred Years (1938) as Judge Parker
 Her Jungle Love (1938) as J.C. Martin
 Judge Hardy's Children (1938) as John Lee
 Over the Wall (1938) as Governor
 Island in the Sky (1938) as Prison Warden Matthews (uncredited)
 Yellow Jack (1938) as Major General Leonard Wood
 Gangs of New York (1938) as Warden
 The Saint in New York (1938) as Inspector Henry Fernack
 Wives Under Suspicion (1938) as Allison
 Crime Ring (1938) as Bank President (uncredited)
 Men with Wings (1938) as Long (uncredited)
 Letter of Introduction (1938) as Lou Woodstock
 Boys Town (1938) as John Hargraves
 Fugitives for a Night (1938) as Police Captain
 Breaking the Ice (1938) as Kane
 Tarnished Angel (1938) as Detective Sgt. Edward Cramer
 Blondie (1938) as J.C. Dithers
 Road Demon (1938) as Anderson
 The Duke of West Point (1938) as Colonel Early
 There's That Woman Again (1938) as Rolfe Davis
 Stand Up and Fight (1939) as Colonel Webb
 Wings of the Navy (1939) as Commandant
 Tail Spin (1939) as Racing Official Starter (uncredited)
 Blondie Meets the Boss (1939) as Dithers
 The Saint Strikes Back (1939) as Inspector Henry Fernack
 The Story of Alexander Graham Bell (1939) as President of Western Union
 In Name Only (1939) as Dr. Ned Gateson
 In Old Monterey (1939) as Stevenson
 Fugitive at Large (1939) as Prison Warden (uncredited)
 Thunder Afloat (1939) as Admiral Girard
 Blondie Brings Up Baby (1939) as J.C. Dithers
 The Amazing Mr. Williams (1939) as Mayor
 Barricade (1939) as Assistant Secretary of State
 The Big Guy (1939) as Jack Lang
 The Saint's Double Trouble (1940) as Inspector Henry Fernack
 Johnny Apollo (1940) as Dr. Brown
 The Saint Takes Over (1940) as Inspector Henry Fernack
 Private Affairs (1940) as George Gilkin
 We Who Are Young (1940) as Braddock
 Blondie Has Servant Trouble (1940) as J.C. Dithers
 Dulcy (1940) as Homer Patterson
 Melody and Moonlight (1940) as Otis Barnett
 Blondie Plays Cupid (1940) as J.C. Dithers
 The Saint in Palm Springs (1941) as Inspector Henry Fernack
 Flight from Destiny (1941) as District Attorney
 Blondie Goes Latin (1941) as Mr. J.C. Dithers
 The Great Swindle (1941) as Swann
 Strange Alibi (1941) as Police Chief Sprague
 Her First Beau (1941) as Mr. Harris
 Blondie in Society (1941) as J.C. Dithers
 Ringside Maisie (1941) as Dr. Kramer
 The Pittsburgh Kid (1941) as Max Ellison
 The Bugle Sounds (1942) as Brigadier-General
 Blondie Goes to College (1942) as J.C. Dithers
 Joe Smith, American (1942) as Blake McKettrick
 The Lone Star Ranger (1942) as Judge [John] Longstreth
 Blondie's Blessed Event (1942) as J.C. Dithers
 Miss Annie Rooney (1942) as Mr. White
 Flight Lieutenant (1942) as Joseph Sanford
 Calling Dr. Gillespie (1942) as Frank Marshall Todwell
 Blondie for Victory (1942) as J.C. Dithers
 The Amazing Mrs. Holliday (1943) as Ferguson
 Hangmen Also Die! (1943) as Dedic
 It's a Great Life (1943) as J.C. Dithers
 Nobody's Darling (1943) as Jason Rhodes
 Footlight Glamour (1943) as J.C. Dithers
 Sweet Rosie O'Grady (1943) as Mr. Fox
 Jack London (1943) as Kerwin Maxwell
 There's Something About a Soldier (1943) as General Sommerton
 This Is the Life (1944) as Dr. Plum
 The Black Parachute (1944) as King Stephen
 Since You Went Away (1944) as Second Train Conductor (uncredited)
 My Buddy (1944) as Senator Henry
 End of the Road (1944) as Gregory McCune
 Dead Man's Eyes (1944) as Dr. Welles
 And Now Tomorrow (1944) as Dr. Sloane (uncredited)
 Hollywood Canteen (1944) as Mr. Brodel (uncredited)
 Leave It to Blondie (1945) as J.C. Dithers
 G. I. Honeymoon (1945) as Colonel Hammerhead Smith
 The Phantom Speaks (1945) as Owen McAllister
 Divorce (1945) as Judge Conlon
 Allotment Wives (1945) as Brig. General H. N. Gilbert
 Man Alive (1945) as Osborne
 Dakota (1945) as Col. Wordin
 The Strange Mr. Gregory (1945) as Defense Attorney Blair
 Life with Blondie (1945) as J.C. Dithers
 Gay Blades (1946) as Whittlesey
 Riverboat Rhythm (1946) as Colonel Edward Beeler
 Blondie's Lucky Day (1946) as J.C. Dithers
 The Cat Creeps (1946) as Walter Elliot
 The Walls Came Tumbling Down (1946) as Captain Griffin
 Easy to Wed (1946) as Hector Boswell
 Angel on My Shoulder (1946) as Citizens for Better Government Chairman (uncredited)
 Blondie Knows Best (1946) as J.C. Dithers
 Rolling Home (1946) as Henry Kane
 Wife Wanted (1946) as Philip Conway
 The Strange Mr. Gregory (1946) as Blair
 The Beginning or the End (1947) as Dr. Vannevar Bush
 The Ghost Goes Wild (1947) as Max Atterbury
 The Vigilantes Return (1947) as Judge Holden
 Black Gold (1947) as Senator Watkins
 Her Husband's Affairs (1947) as Gov. Fox
 High Wall (1947) as Emory Garrison
 Rocky (1948) as Kenneth Forrester
 Call Northside 777 (1948) as Robert Winston - Governor's Aide (uncredited)
 King of the Gamblers (1948) as Sam Hyland
 Silver River (1948) as Major Spencer
 Tap Roots (1948) as General Johnston (uncredited)
 Michael O'Halloran (1948) as Judge Schaffner
 Johnny Belinda (1948) as Dr. Horace M. Gray (uncredited)
 Disaster (1948) as Police Commissioner Jerome
 Rose of the Yukon (1949) as Gen. Butler
 Tell It to the Judge (1949) as Judge Allan J. Brooks
 State Department: File 649 (1949) as Director-General
 Stampede (1949) as Varick
 The Fountainhead (1949) as Guy Francon (uncredited)
 A Dangerous Profession (1949) as Roger Lennert, Lucy's Attorney (uncredited)
 The Baron of Arizona (1950) as Governor
 Federal Agent at Large (1950) as James Goodwin
 Triple Trouble (1950) as Judge
 Three Husbands (1950) as Edward Wurdeman, Attorney at Law
 Short Grass (1950) as Charlie Bissel
 Insurance Investigator (1951) as Russell James
 Strangers on a Train (1951) as Mr. Antony
 Rodeo King and the Senorita (1951) as Dr. Sands
 Let's Go Navy! (1951) as Captain
 The Tall Target (1951) as Passenger from Carolina (uncredited)
 Sunny Side of the Street (1951) as Cyrus Pelley
 She Couldn't Say No (1952) as John Bentley (uncredited)
 Scandal Sheet (1952) as Frank Madison
 Carbine Williams (1952) as Judge Henry P. Lane (uncredited)
 Young Man with Ideas (1952) as Stanley Rickson (uncredited)
 Son of Paleface (1952) as Gov. Freeman (uncredited)
 The Steel Trap (1952) as Tom Bowers
 Taxi (1953) as Mr. Barker (uncredited)
 Kansas Pacific (1953) as Sherman Johnson
 The Flaming Urge (1953) as Mr. Chalmers
 Duffy of San Quentin (1954) as Boyd
 She Couldn't Say No (1954) as John Bentley (uncredited)
 Men of the Fighting Lady (1954) as Home Movie Commentator (uncredited)
 Cattle Queen of Montana (1954) (uncredited)
 The Night Holds Terror (1955) as Bob Henderson
 Jaguar (1956) as Dr. Powell
 The Three Outlaws (1956) as Pinkerton

References

External links

 
 

1891 births
1966 deaths
Burials at Valhalla Memorial Park Cemetery
Canadian expatriate male actors in the United States
Canadian male film actors
Canadian male television actors
Suicides by firearm in California
20th-century Canadian male actors
Male actors from Hamilton, Ontario
1966 suicides